Palanchowk Bhagwati Temple is 7 km north of the mountain of Panchkhal, 15 km of Dhulikhel on the Arniko Highway and, 42 km from Kathmandu. There is a 3 foot tall idol of goddess Bhagawati carved in a black stone.

This temple is believed to have been constructed during the reign of King Mānadeva.

The temple is situated on the top of the Palanchowk hill named after Bhagawati, the height is 1563 meters, and is connected by road to the Arniko Highway.

References

Hindu temples in Bagmati Province
Nepalese culture
Buildings and structures in Kavrepalanchok District